Sasunaga oenistis is a moth of the family Noctuidae. It is found from Sulawesi to Fiji.

External links
Moths in Fiji

Xyleninae